The Gresham Central Transit Center, also known as Gresham Transit Center, is a TriMet transit center and MAX light rail station in Gresham, Oregon, United States. The center is a connection point for several bus routes and the MAX Blue Line.  The light rail station is the 25th stop eastbound on the eastside MAX line, which was the Portland metropolitan area's first light rail line.

The transit center is located at the intersection of NE Kelly Avenue and NE 8th Street in the central part of Gresham. It is a hub for bus service to points in eastern Multnomah County and Portland.

History and description 
It originally opened as a bus-only transit center in 1981, named Gresham Transit Center, in the form of multiple bus stops clustered along 8th Street and Kelly Avenue, a temporary arrangement until construction of a planned off-street facility.  The off-street bus layover area – a short section of bus-only road with purpose-built bus stops – was opened in February 1982.

The adjacent MAX station opened in 1986, and the entire facility was renamed Gresham Central Transit Center at that time.  However, TriMet continues to refer to it as Gresham Transit Center (or Gresham TC) on bus destination signs and bus schedules.  The station originally had no park-and-ride lot, but TriMet built and opened a three-level garage with a ground-floor retail space in 1996.  A 30-space bike-and-ride facility (a secured parking area for bicycles) was built later, inside the garage, and opened in July 2011.

Public art at the transit station includes Living Room, a sculpture comprising vintage furniture cast in concrete and a faux television set cast in bronze, which was installed in 2001 through a public art program. The work was subsequently removed in October 2013.

The transit center was located in TriMet fare zone 4 from 1982 until September 1988, and in zone 3 from then until September 2012, at which time TriMet discontinued all use of zones in its fare structure.

Bus service 
, this station is served by the following bus lines:
FX2–Division
9-Powell Blvd
20–Burnside/Stark
21–Sandy Blvd/223rd
80–Kane/Troutdale Rd
81–Kane/257th Ave
82–South Gresham
84–Powell Valley/Orient Dr
Sandy Area Metro service to Sandy, Oregon

Gallery

See also 
 List of TriMet transit centers

References

External links 

Gresham Central Transit Center – TriMet page

1981 establishments in Oregon
Buildings and structures in Gresham, Oregon
MAX Blue Line
MAX Light Rail stations
Railway stations in Multnomah County, Oregon
Railway stations in the United States opened in 1986
Transportation buildings and structures in Multnomah County, Oregon
TriMet transit centers